František Šterc (27 January 1912 – 31 October 1978) was a Czech football player.

He played club football for SK Židenice.

He played two matches for the Czechoslovakia national team and was a participant at the 1934 FIFA World Cup.

References 
 

1912 births
1978 deaths
People from Šlapanice
Czech footballers
Czechoslovak footballers
1934 FIFA World Cup players
Czechoslovakia international footballers
FC Zbrojovka Brno players
People from the Margraviate of Moravia
Association football forwards
Sportspeople from the South Moravian Region